George Richard Beymer Jr. (born February 20, 1938) is an American actor, filmmaker and artist who played the roles of Tony in the film version of West Side Story (1961), Peter in The Diary of Anne Frank (1959), and Ben Horne on the television series Twin Peaks (1990–1991, 2017).

Early life
Beymer was born in Avoca, Iowa, to George Richard Beymer, a printer, and his wife, Eunice (née Goss). He and his family moved in 1940 to Los Angeles.

Acting career

Child actor
In 1949, Beymer began acting in television in a Los Angeles TV series for children Sandy Dreams (1949–53). He did it for three years, rehearsing after school during the week and recording it on Saturdays. The show ended when he was 13.

Beymer made his feature-film debut in Vittorio De Sica's Stazione Termini (1953). De Sica cast him in part because his dark complexion made him look like Jennifer Jones' nephew.

He was under contract to Jones' husband, David O. Selznick, for a year. Selznick loaned him to Warners to play Jane Wyman's piano protege in So Big (1953).

The contract with Selznick only lasted a year. Beymer found himself in much demand on television: Cavalcade of America (1954) and Johnny Tremain (1957). He guest starred in 26 Men, Zane Grey Theatre, Make Room for Daddy, The Gray Ghost, Navy Log, Whirlybirds, Sky King, Jane Wyman Presents The Fireside Theatre, and Schlitz Playhouse. He auditioned unsuccessfully for the role played by Sal Mineo in Rebel Without a Cause (1954).

20th Century Fox
Beymer achieved success when George Stevens cast him in The Diary of Anne Frank (1959) playing Peter Van Daan.

Beymer was put under contract to 20th Century Fox and started to be regarded as an exciting future star. Producer William Perlberg later said, "It's a thing that periodically happens out here. Somebody comes along and talk starts and agents and studios keep talking and talking. Like an avalanche, the talk gathers speed. Ultimately that 'somebody' turns out to be a big name in Hollywood only."

After appearing in Playhouse 90 he had a supporting role in High Time (1960), a comedy with Bing Crosby and Tuesday Weld at 20th Century Fox. "I wanted to be a very good actor," said Beymer later. "I wanted to work and let the work stand for something."

In June 1960, Beymer was cast in the lead role of Tony in West Side Story (1961), a huge hit. He shared a 1962 Golden Globe Award for New Star of the Year – Actor with Bobby Darin and Warren Beatty.

Beymer later said he "was miserable in West Side Story. I didn't know enough at the time because I lacked certain knowledge in acting... I came out ridiculous. I didn't stand up for what I should have and I didn't know enough. The blame should be on me."

Beymer was reunited with Weld in the Fox comedy Bachelor Flat (1961). At Columbia he played the son of Rosalind Russell and Jack Hawkins in Five Finger Exercise (1962). Beymer later said he was "terrible" in that film.

Beymer was given the role of Nick Adams in Hemingway's Adventures of a Young Man (1962) for Fox, with an all-star supporting cast. Producer Jerry Wald says he and director Martin Ritt agreed that Beymer was "the young actor I think stands the best chance of being the next Gary Cooper." During filming Beymer met Sharon Tate and it was he who encouraged her to get into acting. The film was a big flop.

Beymer had a significant role in the film The Longest Day (1962), which was successful, but he was unhappy with his acting in the film. "They tried to make me the nice kid next door," he said. "That's just not me. They said just play you - but I am not the all American boy."

In December 1962, Richard Zanuck of Fox wanted Beymer in Illicit, based on a story by Vera Caspary but the film was not made; neither was A Promise at Dawn with Ingrid Bergman after Fox studio shut down temporarily due to cost overruns.

Beymer started attending daily classes at the Actors Studio. "I just want to learn and be as professional as I can," he said.

Producer Wald and director Franklin Schaffner cast Beymer in The Stripper (1963) with Joanne Woodward, which was critically acclaimed but not a big hit. Beymer returned to New York. "I got sick of the whole thing and I left," he said.

Semi-retirement
In 1964, Beymer became involved in Freedom Summer in Mississippi. "You get tired of being a complainer, passive," he said.

He assisted Barney Frank in rescuing Freedom Democrat forms in a rental truck that had been confiscated from arrested Freedom volunteers in Canton, Mississippi on Freedom Day (July 16, 1964). During this time, he filmed the award-winning documentary A Regular Bouquet: Mississippi Summer (1964), documenting the efforts of volunteers registering African-Americans to vote.

In February 1964, he said all the films he had done except The Longest Day "should have been classroom work and never should have been shown publicly... I'm not a leading man. I'm a character actor. That is, I'm not a stereotyped leading man type. I'm kind of a schlepp at times... I don't care about billing and being a star. Being myself is the first thing."

Beymer guest starred in episodes of Kraft Suspense Theatre, The Virginian, Bob Hope Presents the Chrysler Theatre, Dr. Kildare, The Man from U.N.C.L.E., and Death Valley Days. He did The Country Girl on stage.

Beymer returned to features with Scream Free! (1969) co-starring his West Side Story co-star Russ Tamblyn, also known as Free Grass. It was never released.

Filmmaker
Beymer turned to filmmaking with The Innerview (1973), which he wrote, produced and directed as well as starred.

He starred in, wrote and directed episodes of the television series Insight. He lived for two years in a commune and worked in Switzerland.

"I never left the movies," Beymer said. "I just made different kinds of movies."

Return to acting
Beymer returned to Los Angeles in 1982 to reactivate his career.

He appeared in Cross Country (1983). He had roles in Paper Dolls (1984), playing the husband of Mimi Rogers, and Generation (1985).  His television appearances at the time include Moonlighting, Dallas, The Bronx Zoo and Buck James, and co-starred in the film Silent Night, Deadly Night 3: Better Watch Out! (1989).

Beymer was widely seen in Twin Peaks (1990–91) playing Ben Horne. He followed it in Blackbelt (1992) and The Presence (1993).

He made three appearances on Star Trek: Deep Space Nine as Li Nalas in the episodes "The Homecoming", "The Circle", and "The Siege".

Beymer could also be seen in Under Investigation (1993), My Girl 2 (1994), State of Emergency (1994), The Disappearance of Kevin Johnson (1996), several episodes of Murder, She Wrote, A Face to Die For (1996), The Little Death (1996), Foxfire (1996), Elvis Meets Nixon (1997) and Home: the Horror Story. He was in episodes of Flipper, The X-Files, Vengeance Unlimited, Profiler, and Family Law.

Beymer reprised his role as Ben Horne in the third season of Twin Peaks in 2017.

In 2019, Beymer visited the set of Steven Spielberg's remake of West Side Story. In December 2021, the film's star, Rachel Zegler, released two photos on her Instagram page: One of Beymer sitting next to Spielberg; another of Beymer hugging Zegler while screenwriter Tony Kushner looked on. According to Zegler, Beymer said "Te adoro María" to her "over and over again" as they embraced.

Filmmaking
In the early 2000s Beymer was already making documentaries. One entitled Whatever Happened to Richard Beymer?, which chronicled his obsession with photography throughout his life, was screened at the 2002 Twin Peaks Festival in Seattle.

He was in Sadie's Waltz (2008) then focused on directing documentaries: The Passing of a Saint (2010), It's a Beautiful World (2014), Richard Beymer's Before... the Big Bang (2016), I Had Bad Milk in Dehradun (2017), and Behind the Red Curtain (2017).

The avant-garde film The Innerview, which he directed, produced, wrote the screenplay for and edited, won the Josef von Sternberg Award at the Mannheim-Heidelberg International Filmfestival in 1974. His 2010 film, The Passing of a Saint, chronicles the funeral rites of Maharishi Mahesh Yogi. In April 2014 his film of a trip to India with David Lynch, It's a Beautiful World, was released.

Books
In 2007 Beymer completed his first book, a self-published novel, Impostor: Or Whatever Happened to Richard Beymer?, a semi-autobiographical account of a young actor's struggle to find himself.

As visual artist
Beymer's photographs of Twin Peaks cast and crew were featured in the gallery of behind the scenes photos on the Definitive Gold Box Edition for Twin Peaks, released on October 30, 2007. He is also a painter and sculptor.

Personal life
As of 2010, Beymer resided in Fairfield, Iowa, where he continued to make films and to write, sculpt, and paint. He practices Transcendental Meditation, to "cool out".

Filmography

Film

Television

References

Further reading 
 Dye, David. Child and Youth Actors: Filmography of Their Entire Careers, 1914-1985. Jefferson, NC: McFarland & Co., 1988, p. 18.

External links

Richard Beymer's Twin Peaks Photos

Richard Beymer at the University of Wisconsin's Actors Studio audio collection

1938 births
American male film actors
American male television actors
Living people
Male actors from Iowa
People from Jefferson County, Iowa
People from Avoca, Iowa